Gummy Song Fetus is a three-track EP consisting of a USB drive embedded inside a gummy fetus. It was first hand-delivered to Love Garden record store in Lawrence, Kansas by Wayne Coyne before its official release date of June 25, 2011, where the early gummy fetuses sold out quickly. Being that the gummy fetuses are smaller than the $150 Gummy Skulls released previously in April 2011, they were originally priced at $30, as opposed to the former's price. Songs were recorded at Tarbox Road Studios in Cassadaga, New York, Steven's computer, Michael's musical M.A.S.H., and Wayne's house in Oklahoma City, Oklahoma, March–May 2011.

Track listing

References

The Flaming Lips EPs
Warner Records EPs
2011 EPs